John II (27 September 1275 – 27 October 1312), also called John the Peaceful, was Duke of Brabant, Lothier and Limburg (1294–1312). He was the son of John I of Brabant and Margaret of Flanders.

John II succeeded his father in 1294 During the reign of John II, Brabant continued supporting a coalition to stop French expansion. He tried to conquer South Holland (district of medieval Holland) from the pro-French Count John II of Holland, but was not successful.

In 1309, the Crusade of the Poor besieged the castle of Genappe in Brabant because it was sheltering Jews. John sent an army that defeated the crusaders, who incurred heavy losses.

John, who suffered from kidney stones and wanted his duchy to be peacefully handed over to his son upon his death, in 1312 signed the famous Charter of Kortenberg. John died in Tervuren in 1312. He was buried in the St. Michael and Gudula Cathedral in Brussels.

Family
On 8 July 1290, John married Margaret of England in Westminster Abbey, London. She was a daughter of King Edward I of England and his first wife, Eleanor of Castile. Only one child was born out of this marriage:
 John III, Duke of Brabant.

John II had several illegitimate children:
 Jan van Corsselaer, was later named Lord of Witthem, Wailwilre, Machelen, la Rochette and Colonster.
 Jan van Wyvliet. Lord of Blaesveld and Kuyc. Married to Margaret Pipenpoy.
 Jan Cordeken: Founder of the House of Glymes. He was legitimized by the emperor Louis IV by charter dated of 27 August 1344, lists John II as the father and Elisabeth Gortygin as his mother.
 Jan Magermann. Married to Adelise d'Elsies.
 Jan II van Dongelberg (- 1383). His mother was Marguerite van Pamel.

References

Sources

16

See also 
 Dukes of Brabant family tree

Dukes of Brabant
Brabant, John II, Duke of
Brabant, John II, Duke of
Burials at the Cathedral of St. Michael and St. Gudula
House of Reginar
14th century in the duchy of Brabant
14th-century people of the Holy Roman Empire